Tributyrin is a triglyceride naturally present in butter. It is an ester composed of butyric acid and glycerol.  Among other things, it is used as an ingredient in making margarine. It is present in butter and can be described as a liquid fat with an acrid taste.

Tributyrin is also used in microbiological laboratories to identify the bacterium Moraxella catarrhalis. 

Tributyrin is a stable and rapidly absorbed prodrug of butyric acid which enhances antiproliferative effects of dihydroxycholecalciferol in human colon cancer cells.

References

Triglycerides